Wallsbüll is a municipality in the district of Schleswig-Flensburg, in Schleswig-Holstein, Germany. Wallsbüll is located near Flensburg in the glacial valley of Wallsbek.

References

Municipalities in Schleswig-Holstein
Schleswig-Flensburg